Uranus was discovered in 1781 and has comparatively rarely been featured in fiction since then. The earliest such works, such as Stanley G. Weinbaum's 1935 short story "The Planet of Doubt" and Clifton B. Kruse's 1936 short story "Code of the Spaceways", portray it as having a solid surface; in the former, humans landing on Uranus encounter hostile aliens. Later works depict it more accurately as a gaseous planet; for instance, Cecelia Holland's 1976 novel Floating Worlds depicts floating cities in the Uranian atmosphere. Towards the end of the 20th century, there was a slight uptick in appearances by Uranus in science fiction, including the 1985 short story "Dies Irae" by Charles Sheffield about life in the atmosphere and the 1999 short story "Into the Blue Abyss" by Geoffrey A. Landis where there is life in the ocean below.

Of Uranus' moons, Ariel was discovered in 1851 and appears in J. Harvey Haggard's 1930s novella "Evolution Satellite", and Miranda was discovered in 1948 and appears in the 1993 short story "Into the Miranda Rift" by G. David Nordley.

References

 
Fiction about ice giants